Demko is a surname. Notable people with the surname include:

Michelle Demko (born 1973), American soccer player and coach
Thatcher Demko (born 1995), American ice hockey player
William Demko (1895–?), American soccer player
George Demko (1933-2015), American scholar and writer

Surnames of Greek origin
Surnames of Russian origin